WatchKit is a framework provided by Apple to develop interfaces for Apple Watch applications. To develop using WatchKit, Apple provides more information and resources in the WatchKit library.

WatchKit contains all the classes that a WatchKit extension uses to develop an application.

Classes 

WatchKit provides some classes for general purposes, as representing controllers, interfaces and alert actions.
 

Also provides support for file management, through the following classes:

And a set of classes that inherit from WKInterfaceObject and represents visual UI elements.

Protocols 

WatchKit provides two protocols: WKExtensionDelegate and WKImageAnimatable. WKExtensionDelegate is intended to manage the behaviour of the WatchKit extension and WKImageAnimatable controls the playback of animated images.

References 

Apple Watch